The following lists sort countries by Stock of loans and debt issued by households as a percentage of GDP according to data by the International Monetary Fund and Institute of International Finance.

International Monetary Fund

Institute of International Finance

See also 
 List of countries by corporate debt
 List of countries by external debt
 List of countries by public debt
 World debt

References 

household
Household debt